Ellsworth Cooperative Creamery is a producer of cheese curds located in Ellsworth, Wisconsin. It has retail locations in Ellsworth and Menomonie, Wi.  The cooperative ships throughout the United States and Ellsworth Cheese Curds are found in grocery store chains in the upper Midwest. Ellsworth Cooperative Creamery is also a milk processing and whey drying plant.

History
The cooperative was started in 1910 to manufacture and sell butter. In 1966 the cooperative began making cheese. Two years later, it began to sell packaged curds. In 1984 Ellsworth was named the State's Cheese Curd Capital because of the Ellsworth Cooperative Creamery. The Ellsworth Cooperative Creamery opened a store in 2010 in Rochester, Minnesota called "The Country Creamery". Similar to the co-op in Ellsworth, the Rochester store sells milk, butter, cheese, and cheese curds. Blaser's Premium Cheeses of Comstock, Wisconsin was purchased by the Ellsworth Cooperative in June, 2011. Today the creamery produces 160,000 pounds of cheese curds daily. It is a supplier of cheese curds for state fairs in Minnesota, Wisconsin, Iowa and Alaska.

The Ellsworth Cooperative Creamery sponsors the annual Cheese Curd Festival in Ellsworth. Begun in 2001, the festival features vendor booths, a beer garden, live auctions, parades, activities for children, and cheese curd eating contests.

See also
 List of dairy product companies in the United States

References

Further reading

External links
 Official website
 Listing at SavorWisconsin.com

Companies based in Wisconsin
Pierce County, Wisconsin
Dairy products companies of the United States
Dairy cooperatives
Agricultural cooperatives in the United States